is a Japanese actor.

Life and career
Miura attended Hino high school in Tokyo. He was originally a member of rock group RC Succession, but was asked to leave the group by their management when they signed a record contract. However, impressed by his looks, the management company asked him to try out acting. In 1974 he appeared in an advertisement for Glico with young singer Momoe Yamaguchi. When casting the male lead for her film Izu no Odoriko, they thought of Miura, and he was chosen as the male lead. The popularity of the Miura/Yamaguchi combination led to them starring together in a series of films and television series. They became known as the "Golden Combi". Although Yamaguchi had a separate career as a singer, this was Miura's main form of employment through the 1970s.

In 1980 Miura and Yamaguchi married, and the 21-year-old Yamaguchi retired from show business. Initially Miura struggled with his acting career, which had consisted of playing Yamaguchi's romantic partner. However, after a few years of struggle, he was able to establish himself as an actor, changing his type from the "clean cut youth" roles he had played with Yamaguchi to "bad boy" roles. He won the award for best supporting actor at the 10th Hochi Film Award and at the 7th Yokohama Film Festival  for Typhoon Club.

Miura is a keen pachinko player and was a smoker until he gave it up at the age of 50. Because of his appearance in cigarette advertisements, it was debated in the Japanese diet whether Miura was an "idol" who could be considered to have a strong influence on underage smoking. Due to his wife's relatively greater fame and popularity, he is sometimes referred to as just "Momoe's husband" (Momoe-chan no Danna-san), a name which he dislikes. The couple have two sons, Yutaro, who went on to marry singer and seiyuu Yui Makino, and Takahiro, and have repeatedly been chosen as "the ideal celebrity couple". According to Miura, they have never had a marital quarrel.

Filmography

Film

Television

Japanese dub

Books
Hishatai (被写体) 1987
Aisho (相性) 2012

Honours 
Medal with Purple Ribbon (2012)

References

External links

1952 births
Japanese male film actors
Living people
People from Yamanashi Prefecture
20th-century Japanese male actors
21st-century Japanese male actors
Male actors from Tokyo
Recipients of the Medal with Purple Ribbon